Despaigne is a Cuban surname. People with this name include:

Alfredo Despaigne, a Cuban baseball player
Joël Despaigne, a Cuban volleyball player
Lázaro Martínez Despaigne, a Cuban sprinter
Oreidis Despaigne, a Cuban judoka
Odrisamer Despaigne, a Cuban baseball player
Rolando Jurquin Despaigne, a Cuban volleyball player
Yordanis Despaigne, a Cuban boxer
Yosvany Despaigne, a Cuban judoka

See also
Despain
Jean D'Espagnet

Surnames of Cuban origin